Sinoinsula is a genus of Chinese jumping spiders that was first described by Y. Y. Zhou & S. Q. Li in 2013.

Species
 it contains twelve species, found only in China:
Sinoinsula curva (Zhou & Li, 2013) – China
Sinoinsula hebetata (Zhou & Li, 2013) (type) – China
Sinoinsula limuensis (Zhou & Li, 2013) – China
Sinoinsula longa (Zhou & Li, 2013) – China
Sinoinsula maculata (Peng & Kim, 1997) – China
Sinoinsula minuta (Zhou & Li, 2013) – China
Sinoinsula nigricula (Zhou & Li, 2013) – China
Sinoinsula ramosa (Zhou & Li, 2013) – China
Sinoinsula scutata (Zhou & Li, 2013) – China
Sinoinsula squamata (Zhou & Li, 2013) – China
Sinoinsula tumida (Zhou & Li, 2013) – China
Sinoinsula uncinata (Zhou & Li, 2013) – China

References

Salticidae genera
Salticidae
Spiders of China